is a city located in Chiba Prefecture, Japan. , the city had an estimated population of  35,674 in 14,688 households and a population density of 350 persons per km².

Geography
Sōsa is located in far northeastern Chiba Prefecture. It is bordered to the north by the Pacific Ocean on the southwest. The land is mostly flat, and much is from 40 to 50 meters above sea level in average elevation.

The northern section, a mixture of valleys, ports and rice fields, consists of a plateau made up of complicated terrain and features.  The southern half consists of flat terrain facing Kujūkuri Beach.

Through the center of the city runs both the Japan Railways (JR) Sōbu Main Line and Japan National Route 126, which run east-west.  To the west of the center of Sosa is Japan National Route 296, which runs north-south.

Neighboring municipalities
Chiba Prefecture
Asahi
Tako
Katori
Yokoshibahikari

Climate
Sōsa has a humid subtropical climate (Köppen Cfa) characterized by warm summers and cool winters with light to no snowfall.  The average annual temperature in Sōsa is 15.0 °C. The average annual rainfall is 1557 mm with September as the wettest month. The temperatures are highest on average in August, at around 25.9 °C, and lowest in January, at around 5.1 °C.

Demographics

Census statistics

History
Sōsa was founded on January 23, 2006 as a result of the merger between the former city of Yōkaichiba, and the former town of Nosaka (from Sōsa District).

A    8 December 1915
B    3 November 1948
C    31 March 1954
D    1 July 1954
E    17 July 1954
F    23 January 2006

Events 
 1 June 1897 – Yōkaichiba Station opened.
 9 October 1946 – Service on Narita Railway Tako Line was discontinued.
 1 April 1970 – Japan National Route 296 was opened.
 23 January 2006 – Yōkaichiba City and Nosaka Town were merged to form Sōsa City.

Government
Sōsa has a mayor-council form of government with a directly elected mayor and a unicameral city council of 18 members. Sōsa contributes one member to the Chiba Prefectural Assembly. In terms of national politics, the city is part of Chiba 10th district of the lower house of the Diet of Japan.

Economy
Sōsa is a regional commercial center whose economy is primarily agricultural.  Sōsa is well known for growing trees that are sold all over Japan.

Major retail

Shopping

	Cainz Home Super Center, Yōkaichiba (Includes Beisia supermarket)
	Ocean Mart 126 (shopping mall)

Financial institutions
	Chiba Bank, Yōkaichiba Branch
	Chiba Industrial Bank, Yōkaichiba Branch
	Keiyo Bank, Yōkaichiba Branch
	Choshi Credit Union, Yōkaichiba Branch

Education

High schools
 Sōsa Prefectural Public High School, Chiba Prefecture
 Keiai University Yōkaichiba High School

Junior high schools
 Yōkaichiba Public Junior High School No. 1
 Yōkaichiba Public Junior High School No. 2
 Nosaka Public Junior High School

Elementary schools
 Heiwa Public Elementary School
 Chinkai Public Elementary School
 Yōkaichiba Public Elementary School
 Sosa Public Elementary School
 Toyosaka Public Elementary School
 Suka Public Elementary School
 Kyoko Public Elementary School
 Yoshida Public Elementary School
 Iidaka Public Elementary School
 Toyowa Public Elementary School
 Sakae Public Elementary School
 Noda Public Elementary School

Transportation

Railway
 JR East – Sōbu Main Line
  –

Bus transportation

Municipal bus routes
 Purple Line (to Toyosaka, Yoshida)
 Pink (to Idaka, Sosa)
 Orange (to Toyowa, Chinkai)
 Yellow (to Heiwa, Kyoko)
 Light Green (to Noda, Eastern-Suka)
 Light Blue (to Sakae, Western- Suka)

Major bus companies
 JR Bus Kanto Company
 Chiba Kotsu

Highway bus

Yōkaichiba Bus Route (Tokyo Station – Sōsa City Hall)
Bus stops at the following areas:
 Tokyo Station (Departing from Tokyo Station:  Yaesu Entrance, Arriving at Tokyo Station:  Nihonbashi Entrance)
 Tomisato Bus Terminal
 Tomisato Nanae Square
 Radison Hotel
 Sanrizuka Park
 Jitaku (Residential) Entrance
 Kuko Hakubutsukan (Aviation Museum)
 Shiromasu
 Somei
 Tako
 Tako Michi no Eki (Road Station)
 Yoshida
 JR Bus- Yōkaichiba Branch
 JR Yōkaichiba Station
 Sōsa City Hall

Choshi-Chiba-Makuhari Route
Bus stops at the following areas:
 License (Menkyo) Center
 JR Kaihimmakuhari Station
 Chiba Minato Station (Monorail)
 Chiba Central Station (Keisei)
 JR Chiba Station
 Chuo 3 Chome (Central District 3)
 Matsuo-Yokoshiba IC (Highway Interchange)
 Matsuo
 Yokoshiba
 Iigura
 Yokaichiba
 Sosa City Hall
 JR Higata Station
 Asahi
 Unakami
 Iioka Health and Welfare Center
 Iioka
 Kousoku Yagi
 Kousoku Obama
 Kousoku Misakicho
 Toshiba
 Jinyacho

Roadways

National highways

Prefectural roads

Main artery roads
 Chiba Prefectural Road 16, Sawara – Yōkaichiba Line
 Chiba Prefectural Road 30, Iioka – Ichinomiya Line
 Chiba Prefectural Road 45, Yōkaichiba – Yachimata Line
 Chiba Prefectural Road 48, Yōkaichiba – Nosaka Line
 Chiba Prefectural Road 49, Yōkaichiba – Sakae Line
 Chiba Prefectural Road 74, Tako – Sasamoto Line

General roads
 Chiba Prefectural Road 104, Yokaichiba – Idono – Asahi Line
 Chiba Prefectural Road 106, Yokaichiba – Sawara Line
 Chiba Prefectural Road 109, Yokoshiba Depot – Yoshida Line
 Chiba Prefectural Road 114, Yokaichiba – Yamada Line
 Chiba Prefectural Road 122, Iioka – Katakai Line
 Chiba Prefectural Road 149, Yōkaichiba – Fuma Line
 Chiba Prefectural Road 212, Yōkaichiba Depot Line
 Chiba Prefectural Road 299, Heiwa – Kyoko Line

Farm road
 Toso Region Farm Roads

Area highways, toll roads

Choshi Renraku Road
 Currently the above road is not within city limits, but according to plans, the Yōkaichiba IC (Interchange) is planned for construction.  The plan is to extend the road from Yokoshiba-Hikari IC area toward the city of Choshi.

Places and events

Locations
 Oio Shrine which dates back to Emperor Sujin Era, Year 7 (258 AD)
 Iidaka Temple (known locally as “Iidaka Danrin (ato)”)
 Chōtoku Temple
 Chōfuku Temple   (in Kawamukai area)
 Shingon-Chisan, Buddhist Sect  (Setsubun Buddhist Mass is held every new year)
 Suka Eastern Orthodox Church

Exhibition and community areas
 Matsuyama Art Museum
 Fureai Koen (Park)- Yōkaichiba
 Formally named the “Municipal and Agricultural Exchange Terminal Community Park of Yōkaichiba”, Sosa City established and controls this institution for the promotion of activity in local industry with the intention of exchange between the municipal and the agricultural parts of the city.
 Horikawa-hama (Beach) Swimming Area
 At a shoreline of roughly 150m, this beach area's waves are calm compared to nearby Kujukuri Beach.

Festivals
 Odaka Hadaka Matsuri (early January)
 Jinkumi Lion Dance (every January)
 Yōkaichiba Bon Festival Dance
 (Yaegaki Shrine) Gion Festival (every August 4 & 5)
 Yokappe Festival (every October)

Notable people of Sōsa 
 Kan Kase (former member, Japanese National Diet)
 Takeo Chii (actor, local promoter)
 Nobuko Sakuma (actress, fashion model)
 Arekisanda Oryō (Comedian)
 Yumiko Kobayashi (voice actress)
 Shigeya Iijima (baseball player, Japan professional league)
 Masaru Uno  (baseball player, Japan professional league)
 Nichirō (Buddhist prelate, Kamakura Era)

References

External links

Official Website  

Cities in Chiba Prefecture
Populated coastal places in Japan
Sōsa